Ein HaEmek (lit. Eye of the Valley) is a community settlement in northern Israel. Located near Yokneam, it falls under the jurisdiction of Megiddo Regional Council.

History
The village was established as a moshav in 1944 by a group of 30 immigrant families from Kurdistan, and was initially named Kedem after the organisation which helped the founders make aliyah.

After the Palestinian village of  al-Rihaniyya was depopulated in the 1948 Palestine war, Ein HaEmek  and  Ramat HaShofet have used its lands.

References

External links
Village website

Community settlements
Former moshavim
Kurdish-Jewish culture in Israel
Populated places established in 1944
Populated places in Northern District (Israel)
1944 establishments in Mandatory Palestine